Ralph Anthony Blakelock (19151963) was a British botanist. He particularly focused on the research of spermatophites.

References

External links

1915 births
1963 deaths
20th-century British botanists